The French surname Renouvin may refer to:

Pierre Renouvin (1893 – 1974), French diplomatic historian
Jacques Renouvin (1905 – 1944), royalist militant in France during the Second World War
Bertrand Renouvin (born 1943), founder and president of French political movement Nouvelle Action Royaliste, son of Jacques Renouvin